Kaleh Darreh (also Romanized as Kāleh Darreh; also known as Kāl Darreh) is a village in Gavork-e Sardasht Rural District, in the Central District of Sardasht County, West Azerbaijan Province, Iran. At the 2006 census, its population was 69, in 18 families.

References 

Populated places in Sardasht County